Kikoły  is a village in Poland. It lies in the administrative district of Gmina Pomiechówek, within Nowy Dwór County, Masovian Voivodeship, in eastern central Poland.

References

Villages in Nowy Dwór Mazowiecki County